Nikita Rumyantsev (born 27 April  1988, Balashikha, Moscow Oblast) is a Russian political figure and deputy of the 8th State Duma. He worked as an assistant to the deputy Andrei Skoch. In 2020, Rumyantsev became a deputy of the Belgorod Oblast Duma. Since September 2021, he has served as a deputy of the 8th State Duma. In February 2021, Rumyantsev was included in the sanctions list of the European Union.

References

1988 births
Living people
United Russia politicians
21st-century Russian politicians
Eighth convocation members of the State Duma (Russian Federation)
People from Balashikha